Anoka Sand Plain is a sandy valley along the Mississippi River in Central Minnesota. It is a subsection of the Eastern Broadleaf Forest Province of Minnesota and Northeast Iowa Glacial moraine complex. It is generally a flat, sandy lake plain, but includes sandy terraces along the Mississippi River formed by glacial outwashes. The terrain includes small dunes, kettle lakes, tunnel valleys, and sandy terraces produced by the Mississippi River and other major tributaries that feed into the Mississippi.

References

Landforms of Minnesota
Glacial erosion landforms